{{DISPLAYTITLE:C21H27N}}
The molecular formula C21H27N (molar mass: 293.44 g/mol, exact mass: 293.2143 u) may refer to:

 Budipine
 Butriptyline
 4-PPBP, or 4-Phenyl-1-(4-phenylbutyl)piperidine

Molecular formulas